Xinhai or the Xinhai revolution occurred in the Xinhai year of the sexagenary cycle.

Xinhai may also refer to:
 Xinhai MRT station
 Xinhai Constructed Wetland
 Xinhai Revolution in Xinjiang
 Xinhai Lhasa turmoil

People with the given name 
 Chang Hsin-hai (1898–1972), Chinese scholar and writer
 Yang Xinhai (1968–2004), Chinese serial killer

See also
 Xinhai Geming (disambiguation)